Radical Sheep Productions was a Canadian television production company known for producing series including The Next Step, Stella and Sam, and The Big Comfy Couch, the latter a Gemini Award-winning series for preschoolers which produced seven seasons and aired for over ten years on YTV and Treehouse TV in Canada and public television stations in the United States.

Among its early work, Radical Sheep made puppets used in the early 1990s educational video series The Adventures of Ruffus & Andy, which marked early appearances of Ruffus the Dog. Founded in 1985 by Robert Mills, the company also once housed the Sheep Shop, which provided puppet construction and design services until 2002 when it closed its doors and Mills stepped aside from running the company. As president, John Leitch managed the business of Radical Sheep, acting as executive producer for all of Radical Sheep's productions and also overseeing the management and sales of Radical Sheep's properties, both domestic and foreign.

On March 31, 2016, Radical Sheep was acquired by Boat Rocker Media.

Filmography

Puppet characters
Spirit of the Forest
Alligator Pie (1991) (television special)
Canadian Sesame Street
Polka Dot Shorts
Zoboomafoo (1999–2001)
The Longhouse Tales

Commercials
Petro-Canada
Zellers
Sleep-Eze D
Robaxacet
Concerned Children's Advertisers (1993)

References

External links
 Ruffus the Dog website
 Ruffus Christmas Carol website
 Robert Mills website

Television production companies of Canada
Mass media companies established in 1985
Mass media companies disestablished in 2018
2016 mergers and acquisitions